Morba was a Peru football club, located in the city of La Esperanza, Trujillo, La Libertad. The club was founded with the name of Club Deportivo Morba FBC in honor of the founder Segundo Moreno Bautista.

History
The club have played at the highest level of Peruvian football on two occasions, from 1990 Torneo Descentralizado to 1991 Torneo Descentralizado when the club was relegated.

In 1992 Torneo Zonal, the club can't classified to the Final Group and was relegated to the 1993 Copa Perú.

Honours

Regional
Liga Departamental de La Libertad: 1
Winners (1): 1990

See also
List of football clubs in Peru
Peruvian football league system

Football clubs in Peru